Tuffield "Tuffy" Latour (born c. 1968) is an American bobsled and skeleton coach and retired bobsledder. His best achievement as a competitor was ninth place in the four-man event at the 1995 World Championships. He later coached the U.S. women's bobsled team (ca. 2000–2002), U.S. men's bobsled team (ca. 2003–2004), Canadian bobsled team (ca. 2009–2010) and U.S. skeleton team (2010–present). His efforts resulted in six Olympic (2002, 2010 and 2014) and at least six world championships medals, including the first-ever women's bobsled Olympic gold for the United States.

Latour is a Sergeant first class serving with the Vermont National Guard. He 
holds a bachelor's degree in organizational management from Ashford University and an MSc degree in sport management from Liberty University. He is married to Kathy and has two children. His grandfather, Tuffield A. Latour, was an Olympic bobsledder.

References

1968 births
Living people
American male bobsledders
Liberty University alumni